The following lists events that happened during 2007 in Ethiopia.

Incumbents
President: Girma Wolde-Giorgis
Prime Minister: Meles Zenawi

Events

January
 January 7 – Fighting breaks out between Somali protesters and Ethiopian troops in the town of Beledweyne after an official is arrested for refusing to hand over a member of the ousted Islamic Courts Union. Three people are reportedly injured.
 January 8 – Abdullahi Yusuf Ahmed, Somalia's interim President, arrives in the capital, Mogadishu, his first visit since Mujahideen forces of the Islamic Courts Union fled advancing Ethiopian troops and interim government soldiers.
 January 23 – Ethiopia begins withdrawing troops from Mogadishu.
 January 27 – Ethiopia is going to withdraw one third of its troops stationed in Somalia by Sunday January 28, 2007, Ethiopia's Prime Minister Meles Zenawi says.

March
 March 30 – An Ethiopian helicopter is downed in Mogadishu as Ethiopian and Somali government troops battle insurgents.

April
 April 22 – More than 60 people are killed in the fourth day of heavy fighting between Ethiopian troops and Islamist militia in Mogadishu.
 April 24 - Ethiopian rebels from the Ogaden National Liberation Front raid a Chinese-run oil field in near the country's border with Somalia, killing 74.

July
 July 20 – The government of Ethiopia pardons and frees opposition leaders who had been sentenced to life imprisonment for their roles in riots following 2005 elections. Prime Minister Meles Zenawi denies that the release was forced by the United States.

September
 September 1 –  International aid agency Médecins Sans Frontières has accused Ethiopia of denying it access to the country's eastern Ogaden region.
 September 11 – The Ethiopian third millennium was celebrated nationwide and concert hall was organized in Millennium Hall in Addis Ababa.
 September 13 – Ethiopia will deploy 5,000 troops as part of a joint United Nations - African Union mission in the Darfur region of Sudan.

October
 October 9 – The Ethiopian Parliament re-elects Girma Wolde-Giorgis for a second six-year term.
 October 21 – The Ogaden National Liberation Front says it has carried out an attack on government troops, killing 140 troops.

December
 December 28 – Ethiopian troops have withdrawn from a key town in central Somalia. Islamist insurgents say they now control Guriel.

References

 
2000s in Ethiopia
Years of the 21st century in Ethiopia
Ethiopia
Ethiopia